The 1985 Melbourne Outdoor, also known as the 1985 Jason Victorian Open, was a Grand Prix tournament held in Melbourne, Australia. It was the third edition of the tournament and was held from 23 to 29 December and was played on outdoor grass courts. Second-seeded Jonathan Canter won the singles title.

Finals

Singles
 Jonathan Canter defeated  Peter Doohan 5–7, 6–3, 6–4
 It was Canter's only singles title of his career.

Doubles
 Mark Edmondson /  Kim Warwick defeated  Brett Dickinson /  Roberto Saad 7–6, 6–1

References

External links
 ITF tournament edition details

Melbourne Outdoor
Melbourne Outdoor
Melbourne Outdoor